Cheongdo station is a railway station on the Gyeongbu Line, located in Cheongdo, North Gyeongsang, South Korea.

External links 
  Station information from Korail

Cheongdo County
Railway stations in Korea opened in 1905
Railway stations in North Gyeongsang Province